Zamyatin is a surname. Notable people with the surname include:

 Denis Zamyatin (footballer, born 1988), Russian football player
 Denis Zamyatin (footballer, born 2002), Russian football player
 Leonid Zamyatin, Soviet ambassador and diplomat
 Valeriy Zamyatin, Ukrainian futsal player
 Yevgeny Zamyatin, Russian writer